The 2013–14 Sacred Heart Pioneers men's basketball team represented Sacred Heart University during the 2013–14 NCAA Division I men's basketball season. This was the Pioneers' 15th season of NCAA Division I basketball, all played in the Northeast Conference. The Pioneers were led by first year head coach Anthony Latina and played their home games at the William H. Pitt Center. They finished the season 5–26, 2–14 in NEC play to finish in last place. They failed to qualify for the Northeast Basketball Tournament.

Roster

Schedule

|-
!colspan=9 style="background:#990000; color:#999999;"| Regular Season

References 

Sacred Heart Pioneers men's basketball seasons
Sacred Heart
Sacred Heart Pioneers men's b
Sacred Heart Pioneers men's b